William Bolding Black Jr. (born August 25, 1936) is a former Deputy Director of the National Security Agency.

Professional career

Early NSA career (1959–1997) 
Black joined the National Security Agency in 1959 as an operational linguist/analyst after three years in the Army. While employed at NSA, Black completed a wide variety of assignments including Special Assistant to the Director for Information warfare; Chief A Group (Operations Analysis); Chief, NSA/CSS Representative Europe office (NCEUR); Associate Deputy Director for Operations/ Military Support; and he served as both Chief and Deputy Chief of a major field installation. As he worked his way up to Senior Cryptologic Executive Service, his primary focus was on building new organizations and creating new ways of doing business. Black retired from the NSA in 1997.

Vice President at SAIC (1997–2000) 
In 1997 Black became Assistant Vice President and Director of Information Operations in the Advanced Technologies and Solutions Group of the Science Applications International Corporation (SAIC). At SAIC, Black led Information Operations research and worked with the Information Operations Technology Center to establish an Institute for the Analysis of Complex Systems to develop advanced techniques for the analysis of networks and critical infrastructures.

Deputy Director at NSA (2000–2006) 
Black returned to the NSA in 2000 to become deputy director. Since 2002 he was overseeing the Trailblazer Project, which was aimed at analyzing data on computer networks, and at tracking cell phone and email communications. In 2002, the main contract for Trailblazer, ultimately worth US$1.2 billion, had been awarded to Black's former employer Science Applications International Corporation. In April 2005, the outgoing NSA director Michael Hayden told a Senate hearing that the Trailblazer program was several hundred million dollars over budget and years behind schedule. After Michael Hayden's promotion to Deputy Director of National Intelligence, Black was acting Director of the NSA until the appointment of the new NSA director Lt. Gen. Keith B. Alexander. In August 2006, Black was replaced by John C. Inglis, and offered to take over the position as liaison officer to NSA's British intelligence counterpart.

A native of New Mexico, Black currently resides in Pasadena, Maryland with his wife Iris. They have three children.

Education
 1979 National War College, Fort McNair, Washington D.C.
 1978–79 George Washington University Master's Program
 1971 University of Maryland at College Park College Park, Maryland Bachelor of Arts/Political Science (Soviet Area Studies)
 1957 U.S. Army Language School Monterey, California (Russian language)

Assignments
 2007 Retired
 2006–2007 Special U.S. Liaison Officer, London
 2000–2006 Deputy Director of the National Security Agency
 1997–2000 SAIC/Information Operations Advanced Technologies and Solutions Group
 1996–1997 Special Assistant to the Director for Information Warfare
 1992–1996 Chief of Operations Analysis, Group A
 1989–1992 Chief, NSA/CSS Representative Europe Office
 1987–1989 Associate Deputy Director for Operations/Military Support
 1986–1987 Chief of the Office of Collection Management
 1984–1986 Chief of a major field installation
 1982–1984 Deputy Chief of a major field installation
 1979–1982 Chief of Operations of a major field installation
 1975–1978 Chief of the Office of Customer Relations and Support to Military Operations

Before 1975, Mr. Black served in various positions at NSA Headquarters, NSA European Headquarters, and The Pentagon.

Significant awards
 2007 The NSA Bronze Medal
 2006 National Security Medal
 2006 3rd Exceptional Civilian Service Award
 2005 Department of Defense Distinguished Civilian Service Award
 2002 Distinguished Executive Presidential Rank Award
 1998 Joint Intelligence Unit Citation for Information Warfare Staff
 1997 2nd Exceptional Civilian Service Award
 1996 National Intelligence Distinguished Service Medal
 1992 Secretary of Defense Meritorious Civilian Service Award
 1986 Exceptional Civilian Service Award
 1984 Senior Executive Service Presidential Rank Award
 1974 Meritorious Civilian Service Award
 1959–80 Elevated through the ranks to the Senior Cryptologic Executive Service

Sources
Public domain biography from the NSA

References

1936 births
Living people
Analysts of the National Security Agency
George Washington University alumni
Deputy Directors of the National Security Agency
Defense Language Institute alumni
People from Pasadena, Maryland
People from New Mexico